Super Junior-H (also known as Super Junior-Happy or Suju-Happy), is the fourth official sub-unit of South Korean boy band Super Junior with consists of five Super Junior members: Leeteuk, Yesung, Shindong, Sungmin, and Eunhyuk.

History

2008: Cooking? Cooking! and Pajama Party
By 2008, all of the Super Junior members have already been a member of at least one subgroup except Kibum. Super Junior-Happy consists of every previous member from Super Junior-T except Heechul, who is replaced by Yesung. Super Junior-Happy made an unofficial debut performance on May 3, 2008 at the Power Concert although they had not formally introduced themselves as the subgroup at the time.

On May 30, 2008, SM Entertainment released the official announcement of the subgroup through Newsen. The subgroup's first EP, Cooking? Cooking!, was released on June 5, 2008. The music video of their first single, "Cooking? Cooking!" was released on that same day.

Super Junior-Happy debuted on June 7, 2008, performing their first single, "Cooking? Cooking!" at the 2008 Dream Concert. On the day before their debut, the subgroup held their first sign fan meeting to celebrate the success of the sales of Cooking? Cooking! On the morning of June 6, over thousands of fans lined up for tickets to the fan meet, overcrowding the streets. Close to 10,000 copies were sold by the first week of release. According to the Music Industry Association of Korea, the EP sold 27,122 by the end of August and was ranked fifth in the monthly charts.

Super Junior-Happy performed their second single, "Pajama Party" on August 3, 2008 on SBS's Popular Songs. The music video was released on August 4, 2008. "Pajama Party" promotions only lasted a month, and promotions for the EP officially ended on September 7, 2008.

Discography

EPs

Singles
 Pajama Party (2008)

Videography

Awards and nominations

Mnet Asian Music Awards

|-
| rowspan="6"| 2008
|-
| Super Junior-Happy
| Artist of the Year
| 
|-
| "Cooking? Cooking!"
| Song of the Year
| 
|-
| Cooking? Cooking!
| Best Dance Performance
| 
|-
| Super Junior-Happy
| Auction Netizen Popularity
| 
|-
| Super Junior-Happy
| Netizen and Mobile Popularity
|

References

External links

 SM Entertainment Official Site
 Super Junior-Happy Official Site

K-pop music groups
Musical groups established in 2008
South Korean boy bands
Super Junior subgroups
SM Entertainment artists
SM Town
South Korean dance music groups
Musical groups from Seoul